This is a list of National Basketball Association players whose last names begin with T, U, or V.

The list also includes players from the American National Basketball League (NBL), the Basketball Association of America (BAA), and the original American Basketball Association (ABA). All of these leagues contributed to the formation of the present-day NBA.

Individuals who played in the NBL prior to its 1949 merger with the BAA are listed in italics, as they are not traditionally listed in the NBA's official player registers.

T

Žan Tabak
Yuta Tabuse
Chris Taft
Chelso Tamagno
Sid Tanenbaum
Dragan Tarlać
Roy Tarpley
Levern Tart
Jae'Sean Tate
Earl Tatum
Jayson Tatum
Walter Tavares
Anthony Taylor
Brian Taylor
Donell Taylor
Fatty Taylor
Fred Taylor
Jay Taylor
Jeff Taylor
Jeffery Taylor
Isaiah Taylor
Jermaine Taylor
Johnny Taylor
Leonard Taylor
Maurice Taylor
Mike Taylor
Ollie Taylor
Ron Taylor
Terry Taylor
Tyshawn Taylor
Vince Taylor
Terry Teagle
Jeff Teague
Marquis Teague
Mirza Teletović
Sebastian Telfair
Collis Temple
Garrett Temple
Miloš Teodosić
Irving Terjesen
Ira Terrell
Jared Terrell
Carlos Terry
Chuck Terry
Claude Terry
Dalen Terry
Emanuel Terry
Jason Terry
Tyrell Terry
Ray Terzynski
Jon Teske
Hasheem Thabeet
Tom Thacker
Floyd Theard
Daniel Theis
Reggie Theus
Peter Thibeaux
Bill Thieben
Justus Thigpen
David Thirdkill
Adonis Thomas
Billy Thomas
Brodric Thomas
Cameron Thomas
Carl Thomas
Charles Thomas
Earl Thomas
Etan Thomas
Irving Thomas
Isaiah Thomas
Isiah Thomas
Jamel Thomas
James Thomas
Jim Thomas
Joe Thomas
John Thomas
Kenny Thomas
Khyri Thomas
Kurt Thomas
Lance Thomas
Malcolm Thomas
Matt Thomas
Ron Thomas
Terry Thomas
Tim Thomas
Tyrus Thomas
Willis Thomas
Trey Thompkins
Bernard Thompson
Bill Thompson
Billy Thompson
Brooks Thompson
Corny Thompson
David Thompson
Dijon Thompson
George Thompson
Hollis Thompson
Homer Thompson
Jack Thompson
Jason Thompson
John Thompson
Kevin Thompson
Klay Thompson
LaSalle Thompson
Mychal Thompson
Mychel Thompson 
Paul Thompson
Stephen Thompson
Tristan Thompson
JT Thor
Skip Thoren
Rod Thorn
Al Thornton
Bob Thornton
Dallas Thornton
Jack Thornton
Marcus Thornton
Sindarius Thornwell
Otis Thorpe
Sedale Threatt
Nate Thurmond
Mel Thurston
Matisse Thybulle
Milt Ticco
Hal Tidrick
Dan Tieman
Killian Tillie
Darren Tillis
Xavier Tillman
Jack Tingle
George Tinsley
Jamaal Tinsley
Wayman Tisdale
Mike Tobey
Paul Tobin
Isaiah Todd
Mike Todorovich
Ray Tolbert
Tom Tolbert
Anthony Tolliver
Chet Tollstam
Dean Tolson
Rudy Tomjanovich
Andrew Toney
Sedric Toney
Andy Tonkovich
Andy Toolson
Jack Toomay
Bernard Toone
Obi Toppin
Irv Torgoff
Bumper Tormohlen
Óscar Torres
Juan Toscano-Anderson
Bill Tosheff
Bob Tough
Axel Toupane
Monte Towe
Keith Tower
Carlisle Towery
Linton Townes
Karl-Anthony Towns
Johnny Townsend
Raymond Townsend
George Trapp
John Q. Trapp
Robert Traylor
Gary Trent
Gary Trent Jr.
Jeff Trepagnier
John Tresvant
Allonzo Trier
Dick Triptow
Kelly Tripucka
Ansley Truitt
Cezary Trybański
Jake Tsakalidis
John Tschogl
Lou Tsioropoulos
Nikoloz Tskitishvili
Al Tucker
Alando Tucker
Anthony Tucker
Jim Tucker
P. J. Tucker
Rayjon Tucker
Trent Tucker
Ronny Turiaf
Mirsad Türkcan
Hedo Türkoğlu
Andre Turner
Bill Turner
Elston Turner
Evan Turner
Gary Turner
Henry Turner
Herschell Turner
Jack Turner (b. 1930)
Jack Turner (b. 1939)
Jeff Turner
John Turner
Myles Turner
Wayne Turner
Melvin Turpin
Dave Twardzik
Jack Twyman
B. J. Tyler
Jeremy Tyler
Terry Tyler
Charlie Tyra

U

Edwin Ubiles
Mo Udall
Ekpe Udoh
Ime Udoka
Beno Udrih
Roko Ukić
Tyler Ulis
Stanley Umude
Wes Unseld
Hal Uplinger
Kelvin Upshaw
Joe Urso
Jim Usry
Jarrod Uthoff
Ben Uzoh

V

Steve Vacendak
Jonas Valančiūnas
Darnell Valentine
Denzel Valentine
Ronnie Valentine
John Vallely
Dick Van Arsdale
Tom Van Arsdale
Butch van Breda Kolff
Jan van Breda Kolff
Gene Vance
Jarred Vanderbilt
Augie Vander Meulen
Logan Vander Velden
Ernie Vandeweghe
Kiki Vandeweghe
Nick Van Exel
Keith Van Horn
Matt Vaniel
Norm Van Lier
Nick Vanos
David Vanterpool
Fred VanVleet
Dennis Van Zant
Ratko Varda
Anderson Varejão
Jarvis Varnado
Greivis Vásquez
Devin Vassell
Chico Vaughn
David Vaughn, Jr.
David Vaughn III
Jacque Vaughn
Ralph Vaughn
Rashad Vaughn
Virgil Vaughn
Loy Vaught
Bob Verga
Peter Verhoeven
Jan Veselý 
Gundars Vētra
João Vianna
Luca Vildoza
Charlie Villanueva
Gabe Vincent
Jay Vincent
Sam Vincent
Marcus Vinicius
Fred Vinson
Claude Virden
Gary Voce
Howard Vocke
Floyd Volker
Alexander Volkov
Noah Vonleh
Whitey Von Nieda
Bernie Voorheis
Jake Voskuhl
Danny Vranes
Slavko Vraneš
Stojko Vranković
Brett Vroman
Jackson Vroman
Nikola Vučević
Sasha Vujačić
Frank Vukosic

References
  NBA & ABA Players with Last Names Starting with T, U, and V @ basketball-reference.com
 NBL Players with Last Names Starting with T, U, and V @ basketball-reference.com

TB